Ittihad Al-Hawija Sport Club, is an Iraqi football team based in Hawija District, Kirkuk, that plays in the Iraq Division Three.

Managerial history
 Waad Al-Zubaidi

See also 
 2020–21 Iraq FA Cup
 2021–22 Iraq FA Cup

References

External links
 Ittihad Al-Hawija SC on Goalzz.com
 Iraq Clubs- Foundation Dates

2019 establishments in Iraq
Association football clubs established in 2019
Football clubs in Kirkuk